Enoco Coal Mine, also known as the Knox County Coal Company, is a historic Bituminous coal mine located in Washington Township, Knox County, Indiana. The facility was built in 1941 by the Knox Consolidated Coal Company and remained in use until 1962.  The property includes five original brick buildings, underground coal tunnels, evidence of tailing piles, railbeds, and other features.

It was added to the National Register of Historic Places in 2010.

References

Industrial buildings and structures on the National Register of Historic Places in Indiana
Industrial buildings completed in 1941
Buildings and structures in Knox County, Indiana
National Register of Historic Places in Knox County, Indiana